Shreya Ghoshal (born 12 March 1984) is an Indian playback singer. She sings in Hindi, Telugu, Bengali, Tamil, Malayalam, Kannada, Marathi, Gujarati, Assamese, Nepali, Oriya, Bhojpuri, Punjabi, Urdu and Tulu languages.

She began her Bengali singing career for films in 2003, she sang for films such as Champion and Mayer Anchal. She received the Anandalok Award for Best Female Playback Singer and ETV Bangla Film Award for Best Female Playback Singer in 2005 for her Manik. She was also honoured with the Bengal Film Journalists' Association – Best Female Playback Award for Shubhodrishti. She sang 317 Songs in Bengali .

Film songs 
She sang 232 film songs in Bengali .

2003

2004

2005

2006

2007

2008

2009

2010

2011

2012

2013

2014

2015

2016

2017

2018

2019

2020

2021

2022

2023

Non-Film Songs 
She sang 85 Non-Film Songs in Bengali .

1998

1999

2000

2001

2003

2012

2013

2015

2016

2017

2018

2019

2020

Footnotes

References 

Bengali
Ghoshal, Shreya
Ghoshal, Shreya